Malportas Pond is a salt-water pond on the north coast of Grand Cayman, Cayman Islands, near North Side village. Local farmer Willie Ebanks introduced West Indian whistling-ducks on the pond in 1990, and it also has populations of heron, egrets, moorhens, and coots. It forms part of the Central Mangrove Wetland Important Bird Area, identified as such by BirdLife International because it supports populations of waterbirds.

References

Landforms of the Cayman Islands
Important Bird Areas of the Cayman Islands
Grand Cayman